Ramalakshmanan Muthuchamy, professionally known as Soori, is an Indian actor and comedian who predominantly appears in Tamil film industry.

Career
Soori moved from Madurai to Chennai in 1996 with the intention of becoming an actor in the Tamil film industry. After failing to get any roles, he took up work in the city as a cleaner to fund his acting ambitions.

He made occasional uncredited roles in films portraying a junior artiste who would appear in comedy scenes, appearing in films such as Winner (2003).

The actor appeared in Vennila Kabadi Kuzhu (2009). Soori got this suffix to his name because of the 'parotta competition' scene in which he stuns the hotelier by eating 50 parottas and getting ready to eat the same number once again. 
He has appeared in Sundarapandian (2012), Varuthapadatha Valibar Sangam (2013), Pandiya Naadu (2013) and Jilla (2014). He acted in Rajini Murugan (2016) Idhu Namma Aalu (2016), Velainu Vandhutta Vellaikaaran (2016) and Sangili Bungili Kadhava Thorae (2017).

He was seen in Sivakarthikeyan's Seema Raja (2018) and Vikram's Saamy Square (2018). However, his performances in these two films were brutally criticised. Soori had back-to-back releases with Namma Veettu Pillai (2019) and Sangathamizhan (2019).

Filmography

Films

References

External links
 

Male actors from Madurai
Tamil comedians
Living people
Male actors in Tamil cinema
1976 births
Indian male comedians
Tamil male actors
21st-century Indian male actors